Mehmet Hakkı Suçin (born 1970) is an author, literary translator and Arabist from Turkey.

Biography
Born in Tuzluca, (then part of Kars), he graduated from Ankara University, Faculty of Letters in 1993. He worked as a translator and interpreter in the Kuwait Embassy to Turkey (1993–1998). He completed his masters thesis on Egyptian novelist and short story author Yahya Haqqi. His PhD was on equivalence problems and strategies in Arabic-Turkish translation and vice versa.

Suçin was one of the team members who produced the semi-dramatic documentary named "Golden Wings: A Story of Courage", sponsored by Turkish Radio and Television Corporation (TRT). He also worked as a visiting fellow at The Centre for Translation and Intercultural Studies, at the University of Manchester.

Suçin chaired commission prepared Arabic curriculums based on CEFR for primary and secondary schools in Turkey (2012-2014). Suçin was one of the Members of the Judges at the International Prize for Arabic Fiction (IPAF) in 2014, and Members of Judges at the Sheikh Hamad Award for Translation in 2015. He won “The Best Translated Book” by Turkish Authors' Association in Turkey in 2016. He has been conducting workshops on literary translation, translation and interpretation since 2012.

He translated into Turkish from both classical and modern Arabic literature including Mu'allaqat poets, Ibn Hazm, Adonis, Mahmoud Darwish, Kahlil Gibran, Nizar Qabbani, Mohammed Bennis and many others. Suçin also translated from Turkish literature into Arabic. He is a member of International Association of Arabic Dialectology (AIDA). His studies focus on translation studies, Arabic literature, and teaching Arabic to non-native speakers. He recently works as a Full Professor at Gazi University in Ankara, Turkey.

Works
Some of his basic publications:

 Öteki Dilde Var Olmak: Arapça Çeviriye Yaklaşımlar (To Be in Another Language: Approaches to Arabic Translation), Istanbul: Say Yayınları, 2013, listed in Translation Studies Bibliography. .
 Dünden Bugüne Arapçaya Çevirinin Serüveni (Translation into Arabic: Past and Today), Ankara: Kurgan Edebiyat, 2012. .
 Haber Çevirisi: Türkçe-Arapça / Arapça-Türkçe + Anahtar Kitap (News Translation between Arabic and Turkish — with Key Book), İstanbul: Opus Yayınları. .
 Aktif Arapça (Active Arabic), Ankara: Engin Yayınevi, 2008. .
 Arabic Curriculum for Secondary Schools in Turkey based on CEFR. Ankara: Ministry of National Education.
 Arabic Curriculum for Primary Education based on the CEFR. Ankara: Ministry of National Education.
 Turkish and Arabic Reduplications in Contrast, Australian Journal of Linguistics, 2010, 30 (2), (209-226).

Translations
 Gassan Kanafani, Güneşteki Adamlar (Turkish translation of Ghassan Kanafani's Men in the Sun), Istanbul: Metis Yayınları, 2023. .
 İbn el-Kelbi, Putlar Kitabı (Turkish translation of Hisham ibn al-Kalbi's The Book of Idols), Istanbul: Kapı Yayınları, 2023. .
 Adonis, Kitap, Hitap, Hakikat (Turkish translation of Adonis' The Book, The Discourse, The Truth), Istanbul: Everest Yayınları, 2022. . 
 Yunus Emre, Mukhtaaraat min Shi'r Yunus Emre / Yunus Emre Seçkisi (Arabic translation of Yunus Emre's poetry), Ankara: Yunus Emre Enstitüsü, 2022. .
 Adania Shibli, Küçük Bir Ayrıntı (Turkish translation of Adania Shibli's Minor Detail), Istanbul: Can Yayınları, 2021. .
 Ibn Tufeyl, Hayy bin Yakzan (Turkish translation of Ibn Tufail's Hayy ibn Yaqdhan), Istanbul: Kapı Yayınları, 2021. .
 Yedi Askı Şiirleri (Muallakalar) (Turkish translation of Mu'allaqat), Istanbul: Kırmızı Kedi Yayınları, 2020. . Selected as "The Best Literary Books of 2020" by Hürriyet Kitap Sanat. 
 İbn Hazm, Güvercin Gerdanlığı (Turkish translation of Ibn Hazm's The Ring of the Dove), Istanbul: Kapı Yayınları, 2018. .
 Halil Cibran, Ermiş (Turkish translation of Kahlil Gibran's The Prophet), Istanbul: Kırmızı Yayınları, 2016. .
 Yahya Hakkı, Umm Hâşim’in Lambası (Turkish translation of Yahya Haqqi's novella titled The Lamp of Umm Hashim), Ankara: Ta-Ha Yayınları, 1998. .
 Mahmud Derviş, Badem Çiçekleri Gibi yahut Daha Ötesi (Turkish translation of Mahmoud Darwish's Like Almond Blossoms or beyond), Istanbul: Everest Yayınları, 2020. .
 Mahmud Derviş, Atı Neden Yalnız Bıraktın (Turkish translation of Mahmoud Darwish's Why Did You Leave the Horse Alone?), Istanbul: Ayrıntı Yayınları, 2017. .
 Mahmud Derviş, Bu Şiirin Bitmesini İstemiyorum (Turkish translation of Mahmoud Darwish's I Don't Want This Poem End), Istanbul: Yapı Kredi Yayınları, 2016. .
 Mahmud Derviş, Mural (Turkish translation of Mahmoud Darwish's Mural), Istanbul: Kırmızı Yayınları, 2015. .
 Adonis, İşte Budur Benim Adım (Turkish translation of Adonis' This is My Name), Istanbul: Everest Yayınları. . 
 Adonis, Belli Belirsiz Şeyler Anısına (Turkish translation of Adonis' Celebrating Vague-Clear Things), Istanbul: Everest Yayınları, 2017. .
 Adonis, Maddenin Haritalarında İlerleyen Şehvet (Turkish translation of Adonis's Desire Moving Through Maps of Matter), Istanbul: Kırmızı Yayınları, 2015. .
 Nizar Kabbani, Aşkın Kitabı (Turkish translation of Nizar Qabbani's The Book of Love), Ankara: Hece Yayınları, 2017. .
 Muhammed Bennis, Aşkın Kitabı (Turkish translation of Muhammad Bennis' The Book of Love), Istanbul: Kırmızı Yayınları, 2015. .
 Nuri el-Cerrah, Midilli'ye Açılan Tekne (Turkish translation of Nouri Al-Jarrah's A Boat to Lesbos), Istanbul: Kırmızı Yayınları, 2019. .
 Şiir Şiir Ayetler - Amme Cüzü Çevirisi (A poetic Turkish translation of first part of Quran), Istanbul: Opus Yayınları, 2015. .
 Ahmet Yesevi, Ahmad al-Yasawi wa Mukhta:ra:t min Di:wa:n al-Hikma (Arabic translation of Ahmet Yesevi's selected Diwan of Wisdom), Ankara: Ahmet Yesevi Üniversitesi Yayınları, 2017 (in Arabic). .
 Melek Mustafa, İçimden Göçenler (Seçme Şiirler) (Turkish translation of Syrian poet Malak Mustafa's selected poems titled Like Almond Blossoms or beyond), Istanbul: Kırmızı Yayınları, 2019. .
 Hulûd el-Mualla, Gülün Gölgesi Yok (Seçilmiş şiirler) (Turkish translation of Emarati poetess Khulood Al Mualla's selected poems titled No Shadow for the Rose), Istanbul: Kırmızı Yayınları, 2014. .
 Ahmed eş-Şehavi, Benim Adıma Bir Gökyüzü (Turkish translation of Egyptian poet Ahmad Al-Shahawy's A Sky in my Name), Istanbul: Kırmızı Yayınları, 2014. .
 Talat S. Halman, Alfiyya min al-Adab al-Turki: Ta:ri:kh Mu:jaz] (A Millennium of Turkish Literature), Ankara: Kültür Bakanlığı Yayınları, 2014. .
 Emin el-Hûli, Arap-İslam Kültüründe Yenilikçi Yaklaşımlar] (Turkish translation of Amin al-Khouli's Renewal in Arabic-Islamic Culture, co-translated with Emrullah İşler), Ankara: Kitâbiyât Yayınları, 2006. .
 Qawâ'id al-Lugha al-Turkiyya li Ghair al-Natiqeen Biha (Turkish Grammar for Arabs; adapted from Mehmet Hengirmen's Yabancılara Türkçe Dilbilgisi) Ankara: Engin Yayınevi, 2003. .

Awards 
 Sheikh Hamad Award for Translation and International Understanding, Achivement Award, 2022. 
 2016 Best Translated Book Prize hosted by Turkish Authors' Association for his translation of Nizar Qabbani's The Book of Love (in Turkish "Aşkın Kitabı")

 2022 Best Translated Book Award hosted by Dünya Kitap Prize for his translation of Adania Shibli's Minor Detail (in Turkish "Küçük Bir Ayrıntı")

References

External links
 Website
 Blog

Turkish Arabists
Turkish orientalists
Academic staff of Gazi University
Translation scholars
Living people
1970 births